{{DISPLAYTITLE:C7H8N2O}}
The molecular formula C7H8N2O (molar mass: 136.154 g/mol, exact mass: 136.0637 u) may refer to:

 3-Aminobenzamide
 Nicotinyl methylamide

Molecular formulas